The epidural venous plexus is a network of interconnecting veins located in the anterior epidural space, in the outermost part of the spinal canal.  It runs from the skull base to the sacrum.  It is surrounded by very little fat, although the levels increase towards the lower levels of the spine.

References 

Spinal cord